Compaq's first computers' form factors were portable, also called "luggables", and then "lunchbox computers", and together constituted the Compaq Portable series. As the products evolved, laptops and notebooks were created offing a new level of portability that caused the market to explode.

Some of the portables, the Portable and Portable II, had CRT monitors, while later the Portable III and the Portable 386) had flat, monochrome, usually amber, plasma displays. The portables came/could come with internal hard disk drives on 0.5" shock mount springs; diskette drives, usually 5-" double- or quadruple-density drives; batteries; and/or a dual-ISA expansion chassis, about one full-drive-height wide. Note this was before the term "ISA" became a standard. The Compaq Portable 486 included mono and color LCD screens and were battery powered.

Machines of the series
 Compaq Portable – Compaq's first computer; first 100% IBM PC compatible
 Compaq Portable Plus – Compaq's version with built-in hard drive
 Compaq Portable 286 – Compaq's version of the PC AT in the original Compaq Portable chassis; equipped with 6/8-MHz 286 and a high-speed 20-MB hard drive
 Compaq Portable II – smaller and lighter version of Compaq Portable 286; it was less expensive but with limited upgradability and a slower hard drive
 Compaq Portable III
 Compaq Portable 386
 Compaq Portable 486 and Compaq Portable 486c

The Compaq Portable is an early portable computer which was one of the first 100% IBM PC compatible systems. It was Compaq Computer Corporation's first product, to be followed by others in the Compaq Portable series and later Compaq Deskpro series.

Initial Production and Competition
The  Compaq Portable folded up into a luggable case the size of a portable sewing machine. In the second year revenue hit  setting an industry record.

The computer was an early all-in-one, becoming available two years after the CP/M-based Osborne 1 and Kaypro II, in the same year as the 8088 and MS-DOS-based (but not entirely IBM PC compatible) Dynalogic Hyperion, and a year before the Commodore SX-64. Its design was influenced by that of the Xerox NoteTaker, a prototype computer developed at Xerox PARC in 1976. Other portable "work-alikes", that were not PC compatible clones include the Seequa Chameleon, and Corona Data Systems' Model PPC-400, and Eagle Computer's Eagle Spirit Portable. They were all short-lived competitors.

IBM responded to the Compaq Portable with the IBM Portable, developed because its sales force needed a comparable computer to sell against Compaq.

Design 
The Compaq Portable has basically the same off-the-self hardware as an IBM PC, transplanted into a luggable case (specifically designed to fit as carry-on luggage on an airplane), with Compaq's BIOS instead of IBM's. All Portables shipped with 128k of RAM and 1-2 double-sided double-density 360 KB disk drives.

The machine uses a unique hybrid of the IBM MDA and CGA which supports the latter's graphics modes, but contains both cards' text fonts in ROM. When using the internal monochrome monitor the 9x14 font is used, and the 8x8 one when an external monitor is used (the user switches between internal and external monitors by pressing ). The user can use both IBM video standards, for graphics capabilities and high-resolution text. With a larger external monitor, the graphics hardware is also used in the original Compaq Deskpro desktop computer.

Compaq used a “foam and foil” keyboard from Keytronics, with contact mylar pads that were also featured in the Tandy TRS-80, Apple Lisa 1 and 2, Compaq Deskpro 286 AT, some mainframe terminals, SUN Type 4, and some Wang keyboards. The foam pads the keyboards used to make contact with the circuit board when pressed disintegrate over time, due to both the wear of normal use and natural wear. The CRT display also suffered from a low refresh rate and heavy ghosting.

Software 
Compaq's efforts were possible because IBM had used mostly off-the-shelf parts for the PC and published full technical documentation for it, and because Microsoft had kept the right to license MS-DOS to other computer manufacturers. The main difficulty was the BIOS, because it contained IBM's copyrighted code. Compaq solved this problem by producing a clean room workalike that performed all documented functions of the IBM PC BIOS, but was completely written from scratch.

Although numerous other companies soon also began selling PC compatibles, few matched Compaq's achievement of essentially-complete software compatibility with the IBM PC (typically reaching "95% compatibility" at best).Then Phoenix Technologies and others began selling similarly reverse-engineered BIOSs on the open market.

The first Portables used MS-DOS essentially identical to PC DOS 1.10 except for having a standalone BASIC that did not require the IBM PC's ROM Cassette BASIC, but this was superseded in a few months by MS-DOS 2.00 which added hard disk support and other advanced features. The initial Portables are similar to the 16K-64K models of the IBM PC in that the BIOS was limited to 544K of RAM and did not support expansion ROMs, thus making them unable to use EGA/VGA cards, hard disks, or similar hardware. After DOS 2.x and the IBM XT came out, Compaq upgraded the BIOS. Although the Portable was not offered with a factory hard disk, users commonly installed them. Starting in 1984, Compaq began offering a hard-disk equipped version in the Portable Plus. The original hard disks offered would be 10 or 21 megabytes, although bad sectors often reduced the space available for use.

Reception 
BYTE wrote, after testing a prototype, that the Compaq Portable "looks like a sure winner" because of its portability, cost, and high degree of compatibility with the IBM PC. Its reviewer tested IBM PC DOS, CP/M-86, WordStar, SuperCalc, and several other software packages, and found that all worked except one game. PC Magazine also rated the Compaq Portable very highly for compatibility, reporting that all tested applications ran. It praised the "rugged" hardware design and sharp display, and concluded that it was "certainly worth consideration by anyone seeking to run IBM PC software without an IBM PC".

Later Models 
The Compaq Portable Plus simply had a hard drive to replace one floppy disk drive, and logos and badges with gold backgrounds instead of silver. Independent computer stores were previously doing this upon request of users, and Compaq saw this as a lost revenue opportunity. In 1985, Compaq introduced the Portable 286, although it was replaced by the more compact Portable II in a redesigned case within a few months. The Portable 286 featured a full height hard disk, and the options of one half-height floppy drive, two half-height floppy drives, or a half-height floppy drive and a tape backup drive The Compaq Portable 286, Compaq's version of the PC AT was offered in the original Compaq Portable chassis; equipped with  286 and a high-speed  hard drive
The Compaq Portable II – was smaller and lighter version of Compaq Portable 286; it was less expensive but with limited upgradability and a slower hard drive. 

The Compaq Portable III was another AT-compatible computer released in 1987. It was advertised as being much smaller and lighter than the previous portable x86-PCs, however it was still quite large by today's standards. Three models were announced at release. Power is supplied using a mains electricity outlet, no battery exists.

The Compaq Portable III, Compaq Portable 386, Compaq Portable 486 and Compaq Portable 486c were later in the series.

References

External links 

 Old Computers - Compaq Portable
 CED in the History of Media Technology - Compaq Portable
 Obsolete Computer Museum - Compaq Portable description

See also
 Compaq SLT laptop series
 Compaq LTE notebook series - initially co-developed with Citizen Watch Company 
 Compaq Contura value notebook series
 Compaq Contura Aero subnotebook series
 Compaq Aero handheld series
 Compaq Concerto pen table convertible

 
IBM PC compatibles